Adolfo Aristeguieta Gramcko (January 1929, in Caracas – August 1998) was a Venezuelan writer, medical doctor, Scout leader and ambassador to Germany.

Studies 
Aristeguieta attended primary school in Puerto Cabello, Carabobo state, about 260 km west of the capital.
He continued through secondary education at the Colegio La Salle in Caracas, and graduated with a bachelor's degree in Biological Sciences.
He then studied medicine at the Universidad Central de Venezuela, Escuela Luis Razetti and earned the title of Surgeon, and subsequently a Doctorate in Medicine with a thesis on tropical medicine.
He studied psychiatry in Chile and Switzerland, and became a specialist in this area.

Professional work 
Aristeguieta was linked to the Venezuelan Council of the Child, where he worked for the boys who had to stay home for observation. (Juvenile Detention)
He designed and directed the "Camping as a Scout" programme, an activity conducted by Scouts for participants who are boys with very low income, or from marginal areas, or (so-called) 'of the street'.
He joined the Venezuelan Society for the History of Medicine.
He was a diplomat of Venezuela. President Luis Herrera Campins appointed him Venezuela's ambassador to Germany.
Besides Spanish, he mastered English, French, German and other languages.
He collaborated with publications in The Homeopathic Gaceta de Caracas and joined the Board of Directors of the Venezuelan Congress of Homeopathic Medicine.

Role in Scouting 
When he was a child, Aristeguieta participated as a Boy Scout at La Salle Scout Group in Caracas, and in January 1963, in the Scout Camp School Paramacay, while he was the director of a Preliminary course for leaders of Clan. At that time he held the position of National Commissioner for Training. He was Executive Secretary of the Interamerican Scout Council when its headquarters were in San José, Costa Rica.

Scout Association of Venezuela 
After the first Conference of Scouting in 1946, Venezuela became further engaged with World Scouting and the training scheme aimed at Gilwell Park. For several years, Venezuelan leaders took their courses abroad, usually Wood Badge courses, including Adolfo Aristeguieta Gramcko, who extended his Wood Badge in Catalina de Güines, Cuba.
In 1951, he created the National Training Scout Bureau, led by Franz L. Huigen, attached to the National Scout Office. In December 1955 the staff participated in the course of the first Wood Badge issued in Venezuela at the ranch "La Guadeloupe, in Ocumare del Tuy, Miranda State.
In March 1956 he worked at the Wood Badge Course for Commissioners.
In 1957, he served as Head of Field for the first Wood Badge course for leaders of Cub Scouts Branch at Hacienda el Encantado.

Vision for Latin America and the world 
He designed and managed, in many Latin American countries, the "New Directions" seminar, which exhorted Scout leaders to reflect on the origins of Scouting, its principles, methods, programs, and the need to reach more individuals.

He worked at the World Scout Bureau, which commissioned the review of the training program.

He chaired the Inter-American Council of Scouting and worked with the Food and Agriculture Organization and Organization of American States.

In 1976, the World Organization of the Scout Movement decorated him with the Bronze Wolf, the highest recognition of the youth movement, for his work in the World Scout Committee and Regional.

In recognition of his important role in training several generations, the Scout Association of Venezuela established the Order Adolfo Aristeguieta Gramcko to recognize Scout leaders with a proven dedication to the design, implementation and assessment of Scouting programs. This order highlights the importance of work in curriculum design and its constant revision to ensure they remain current and therefore the quality of training events. It is given to reward constant effort in this area for a period not less than eight (8) years, although other roles in the institution are eligible.

The World Baden-Powell Fellowship named him an Honorary Member in memoriam.

Bibliography 
 El Gran Juego
 La importancia del Libro de las Tierras Vírgenes
 Alexander Von Humboldt e Hispanoamérica
 Hadas, duendes y brujas del puerto, Ediciones de la Gobernación del Estado Carabobo, .
 Los "Juegos psicológicos" como factor interferente en la expansión del Escultismo
 Reflexiones ante la evolución del pensamiento medico
 Reflexiones ante la evolución del pensamiento medico
 Contribución para la interpretación del fenómeno hippie

References

External links 
 The value of Jungle Book
 The educative value of Jungle Book
 Scouts of Venezuela badge
 His work on Lasalle Scout Group of Caracas
 Adolfo Aristeguieta's Biography
 The great game by Adolfo Aristeguieta
 His role on Scouts of Venezuela Association
 His advices for youth people education
 Adolfo Aristeguieta's teachings
 Adolfo Aristeguieta's Academic works
 His work at Interamerican Scout Council and the Organization of American States, OAS
 His work at Interamerican Scout Council, CSI
 His work at Food and Agriculture Organization, FAO

1929 births
1998 deaths
Scouting pioneers
Recipients of the Bronze Wolf Award
Outdoor educators